601 West 29th Street is a building under construction in Chelsea, Manhattan, New York City developed by Douglaston and designed by the architectural firm FXCollaborative. The building is built on infill and will be adjacent to the High Line and the Hudson Yards development. Douglaston purchased  of air rights from the nearby Chelsea Piers to construct the building, and is coordinating with Lalezarian as 601 West 29th neighbors their construction site at 606 West 30th Street.

History
The site formerly held a studio used by the artist Jeff Koons. Douglaston acquired the site through a 99-year ground lease for $129.6 million.

In June 2019, Ares Management invested $160 million in equity in the project. At the same time, the development raised $415 million in construction debt from a consortium of banks led by HSBC including Bank of China, Helaba, Banco Santander, and Raymond James Financial. Excavation for the building's foundations began in September 2019.

Design
New permits were filed in September 2018, indicating that the building will have 931 units, including 234 affordable apartments. Planned amenities include a fitness center, outdoor terraces, a pool, private cabanas, a pet daycare, and 198 subterranean parking spaces. Additionally, the ground floor will contain  of retail space.

References

Chelsea, Manhattan
Residential buildings in Manhattan
Buildings and structures under construction in the United States